The Balu bow-fingered gecko or Besar Island bent-toed gecko (Cyrtodactylus baluensis) is a species of gecko endemic to Borneo. It is known from Brunei, Sarawak and Sabah (Malaysia), and East Kalimantan (Indonesia).

References

Cyrtodactylus
Endemic fauna of Borneo
Reptiles of Brunei
Reptiles of Indonesia
Reptiles of Malaysia
Reptiles described in 1890
Taxa named by François Mocquard
Reptiles of Borneo